Hans Erik "Hatto" Söderström (born 21 January 1957) is a Swedish curler, a two-time  and a 1981 Swedish men's curling champion.

In 1981 he was inducted into the Swedish Curling Hall of Fame.

Teams

References

External links
 

Living people
1957 births
Swedish male curlers
Swedish curling champions
20th-century Swedish people